The 1991 WAFL season was the 107th season of the various incarnations of the West Australian Football League. With the West Coast Eagles still pushing attendances down and club finances into the red, the league made further experiments. Following on from the VFL and SANFL it introduced a ‘final five’ to replace the final four in use since 1905, but this did not produce the hoped-for financial benefits and was abandoned after four seasons. A more enduring result of this chance was a ‘double-header’ system of playing finals, whereby the two senior semi-finals were played at Subiaco Oval on the same day, with the first game starting just before noon and the second at the traditional time for playing finals. As a consequence of the double-headers, reserves finals were played at Fremantle Oval and colts at Bassendean.

The league also reverted to the ‘WAFL’ moniker after the change to ‘WA State League’ or ‘WASFL’ was regarded as a failure. At the end of the home-and-away season, the WAFL saw offers from Kalgoorlie City, the South West National Football League and Geraldton to join as expansion clubs in an effort to gain more revenue from television – these proposals never materialised, but the first expansion since 1934 was to occur six seasons later with Peel Thunder.

On the field, Claremont won its fifth consecutive minor premiership in more decisive fashion than any of the previous four, losing only one match after the opening round and achieving the third-longest winning streak in open-age football, though their unbeaten sequence did not equal the 22 games achieved in 1987/1988. The Tiger dynasty would be broken the following season as the drafting of ten key players by AFL clubs decimated their ranks and they avoided the wooden spoon only by percentage in 1992.

Perth and East Perth, pre-1979 power clubs, both returned to the finals after long absences, in the Royals’ case after the bleakest era in their history with only 33 wins in 126 matches and in the Demons’ after being doomed pre-season to win only a couple of games after a clean-out and their 1990 Colts having won only once. East Fremantle, who had not missed finals participation since 1982, were decimated by the in-season resignation of coach Ron Wilcox and president Hans Beyer and did not play finals in any grade. The Sharks were also affected by the loss of number one ruckman Lance Durack after an altercation with Beyer – Durack was recruited by Swan Districts but never played for them and returned to the blue and whites in the tenth round. East Fremantle did recover during June and July but a serious lack of depth, well known to coach Judge, drove them off-course in August. South Fremantle had their worst season since the disaster of 1987, losing in spectacular fashion on numerous occasions in July and August, whilst West Perth, who at one point had due to senior-list injuries to give seven of their colts team a second match in a single day with the reserves, took their second consecutive wooden spoon.

On an individual front, Subiaco broke the longest club drought in Sandover Medal history, winning for the first time since Haydn Bunton, Sr. in 1941. The Lions were, however, to suffer the ignominy of losing the Grand Final in all three grades.

Home-and-away season

Round 1

Round 2

Round 3

Round 4 (Anzac Day)

Round 5

Round 6

Round 7

Round 8

Round 9 (Foundation Day)

Round 10

Round 11

Round 12

Round 13

Round 14

Round 15

Round 16

Round 17

Round 18

Round 19

Round 20

Round 21

Ladder

Finals

Elimination and Qualifying Finals

Semi-finals

Preliminary final

Grand Final

References

External links
Official WAFL website
West Australian Football League (WAFL), 1991

West Australian Football League seasons
WAFL